Odontonema, the toothedthreads, is a genus of flowering plants in the family Acanthaceae. It is native to Central America.

Species
 Odontonema albiflorum Leonard
 Odontonema album V.M.Baum
 Odontonema amplexicaule Nees
 Odontonema auriculatum (Rose) T.F. Daniel
 Odontonema bracteolatum (Jacq.) Kuntze
 Odontonema brevipes Urb.
 Odontonema callistachyum (Schltdl. & Cham.) Kuntze
 Odontonema cuspidatum (Nees) Kuntze – Mottled toothedthread
 Odontonema foliaceobracteatus (Oerst.) Kuntze
 Odontonema glaberrimum (M.E. Jones) V.M. Baum
 Odontonema glabrum Brandegee
 Odontonema hondurensis (Lindau) D.N.Gibson
 Odontonema laxum Baum, V.M. 
 Odontonema liesneri Wassh.
 Odontonema mazarunensis Wassh.
 Odontonema microphyllus Durkee
 Odontonema mortonii V.M. Baum
 Odontonema nitidum (Jacq.) Kuntze – Shrubby toothedthread
 Odontonema rubrum (Vahl) Kuntze
 Odontonema rutilans (Planch.) Kuntze
 Odontonema schomburgkianum Kuntze
 Odontonema speciosum V.M. Baum
 Odontonema strictum
 Odontonema tubaeforme (Bertol.) Kuntze – Firespike

References

External links

 
Acanthaceae genera
Taxonomy articles created by Polbot